The Battle of Wandiwash was a battle in India between the French and the British in 1760. The battle was part of the Third Carnatic War fought between the French and British colonial empires, which itself was a part of the global Seven Years' War. It took place at Vandavasi (Wandiwash being the Anglicised pronunciation) in Tamil Nadu. Having made substantial gains in Bengal and Hyderabad, the British, after collecting a large amount of revenue, were fully equipped to face the French in Wandiwash, whom they defeated.

Order of battle

According to the 19th century book Annals of the Wars of the Eighteenth Century by Author Eduard Cust, the French Army consisted of 300 European Cavalry, 2,250 European infantry, 1,300 sepoys (Indian soldiers), 3,000 Marathas and 16 pieces of artillery while the English deployed about 80 European Horses, 250 Native horses, 1,900 European Infantry, 2,100 sepoys and 26 pieces of artillery.

Battle

The French, commanded by the Comte de Lally, were burdened by a lack of naval support and funds, and therefore attempted to regain the fort of Vandavasi, now in Tamil Nadu. While attempting to do so, they were attacked by British forces commanded by Sir Eyre Coote, and in the ensuing battle, the French were decisively defeated.

Aftermath

The Battle of Wandiwash resulted in the British capture of Chetpattu (Chetpet), Tirunomalai (Thiruvannaamalai), Tindivanam and Perumukkal. As a consequence of the engagement, the French in South India, under the command of general Marquis de Bussy-Castelnau, were then restricted to Pondichéry, where they surrendered on 22 January 1761. The collapse of the French position in India was one of the events that compelled France to sign the Treaty of Paris, reducing the French to little more than traders in India, and effectively ending further French imperial ambitions in that country. Britain, on the other hand, established its supremacy in India over other European powers after this battle.

See also
 Great Britain in the Seven Years' War
 France in the Seven Years' War

References

External links
 Thomas J. Mullen, Jr. Seven Years’ War: Battle of Wandiwash February 1994 issue of Military History magazine

Colonial India
Former French colonies
Wandiwash
Wandiwash
History of Tamil Nadu
Wandiwash
Wandiwash
1760 in India
Wandiwash
18th century in French India